Stefan Ciapała (12 September 1922 – 22 August 1989) was a Polish bobsledder. He competed in the two-man and the four-man events at the 1956 Winter Olympics.

References

1922 births
1989 deaths
Polish male bobsledders
Olympic bobsledders of Poland
Bobsledders at the 1956 Winter Olympics
Sportspeople from Zakopane